Metarctia nigritarsis is a moth of the subfamily Arctiinae. It was described by Emilio Berio in 1941 and is found in Eritrea.

References

 Arctiidae genus list at Butterflies and Moths of the World of the Natural History Museum

Metarctia
Moths described in 1941